A Night on the Town is Rod Stewart's seventh album, released in 1976. The cover art is based on Pierre-Auguste Renoir's painting Bal du moulin de la Galette, with Stewart inserted in the centre in period costume. On 30 June 2009, Rhino reissued the album as a two-disc CD with bonus tracks. A Night on the Town was Stewart's last UK number-one studio album until Time in 2013.

The album is regarded as one of Stewart's finest. "The Killing of Georgie" is one of Stewart's most hard hitting set of lyrics, a melancholic tale of a gay friend who is cast out by his family and becomes a sensation in the New York nightlife, only to be murdered by a New Jersey gang during an attempted robbery. Controversial "Tonight's the Night" was a No. 1 hit but was banned by some radio stations due to the very obvious lyrics about sex and loss of virginity. A cover of Cat Stevens' "The First Cut Is the Deepest" was also a success and has since become one of Stewart's signature songs.

Track listing

Original release

2009 re-release

Personnel
 Rod Stewart – vocals
 Donald Dunn, Bob Glaub, David Hood, Willie Weeks, Lee Sklar – bass guitar
 Steve Cropper, Billy Peek, Joe Walsh, Jesse Ed Davis, David Lindley, Fred Tackett, Pete Carr – guitar
 John Barlow Jarvis, David Foster, Barry Beckett, J. Smith – keyboards
 Roger Hawkins, Andy Newmark, Al Jackson Jr., Rick Shlosser – drums
 Tommy Vig, Joe Lala – percussion
 Jimmy Horowitz, Mel Lewis, Arif Mardin – string arrangements
 Tower of Power horn section – French horn
 Jerry Jumonville, Plas Johnson – tenor saxophone

Charts

Weekly charts

Year-end charts

Certifications and sales

References

Rod Stewart albums
Riva Records albums
1976 albums
Albums produced by Tom Dowd
Albums recorded at Muscle Shoals Sound Studio
Warner Records albums